James Hewitson VC (15 October 1892 – 2 March 1963) was an English recipient of the Victoria Cross, the highest and most prestigious award for gallantry in the face of the enemy that can be awarded to British and Commonwealth forces.

Details
Born in Coniston, Lancashire, 15 October 1892, He was a 25 years old lance-corporal in the 1/4th Battalion, The King's Own (Royal Lancaster) Regiment, British Army during the First World War when the following deed took place for which he was awarded the VC.

On 26 April 1918 at Givenchy, France, in a daylight attack on a series of crater posts, Lance-Corporal Hewitson led his party to their objective, clearing the enemy from both trench and dug-outs, killing six who would not surrender. After capturing the final objective he saw a hostile machine-gun team coming into action against his men and working his way round the edge of the crater he attacked the team, killing four and capturing one. Shortly afterwards he routed a bombing party which was attacking a Lewis gun, killing six of them.

He died 2 March 1963 in Ulverston and is buried at St Andrew's Churchyard, Coniston. His medal is privately held.

References

Monuments to Courage (David Harvey, 1999)
The Register of the Victoria Cross (This England, 1997)
VCs of the First World War - Spring Offensive 1918 (Gerald Gliddon, 1997)

External links
Location of grave and VC medal (Cumbria)
 

King's Own Royal Regiment soldiers
British World War I recipients of the Victoria Cross
British Army personnel of World War I
People from Coniston, Cumbria
1892 births
1963 deaths
British Army recipients of the Victoria Cross
Military personnel from Lancashire